Sandipani, sometimes rendered Sāndīpana, is the guru of Krishna and Balarama in Hinduism. He is regarded to have educated them regarding all the Vedas, the art of drawing, astronomy, gandharva veda, medicine, training elephants and horses, and archery.

Legend 
The Bhagavata Purana relates the following story regarding Sandipani: While staying as students at the residence of Sandipani, the brothers Krishna and Balarama, and their friend, Sudama, mastered every single lesson, although only having been instructed in each once. Upon the rapid completion of their studies, they persuaded their teacher to ask for the preceptor’s dakṣiṇā (a type of honorarium to one's guru) of his own choosing. Sandipani asked for the restoration of his child, who had disappeared in the ocean at Prabhasa. The two brothers travelled to Prabhasa and found that the son had been snatched away by a being named Śaṅkhāsura. Krishna rescued his son and they returned him to their preceptor.

In the Harivamsha Purana, Krishna learnt that Sandipani's son has been swallowed by an asura called Panchajana, and had perished. Krishna and his brother travelled to Yamaloka to persuade Yama to restore his preceptor's son back to life, and succeeded:

Gallery

External links
Main extract of the Bhagavata Purana related to Sandipani

References

Rishis
People related to Krishna
Characters in the Mahabharata
Indian Hindu spiritual teachers